So Sweet, So Dead (also known as The Slasher is the Sex Maniac and Penetration (the US version with hardcore inserts involving Harry Reems and Kim Pope)) is a 1972 Italian giallo film directed by Roberto Bianchi Montero.

Plot 
Inspector Capuana, a small town investigator who transferred to the big city with his wife Barbara, investigates the murder of a brutally slashed woman, naked in her bed with developed photos scattered around her corpse, showing she was having an affair. The chief insists Capuana dedicate to the case, as he's the best man for the job, even in the heat of scrutiny from the papers consistently criticizing the competence of the police. As the murder is high-profile, the police put a rush on rounding up the usual suspects of gays, transvestites, prostitutes, drug addicts, and vagrants, with no promising results. Professor Casali, Capuana's trusted colleague, provides critical incite and offers a psychological profile of the killer through autopsy work and analysis of the crime's execution. Casali's trusted assistant in the morgue, Gastone, is briefly considered a suspect by Capuani, as he retains naked pictures of the dead women he prepares and is possibly a necrophile, but this worry is soon dispatched.

The killings progress, with more women being slashed at their liaison places, in their homes, one even on a commuter train. They all are found dead with photos of affairs with their lovers scattered at the scenes of the crimes. One husband with physical disabilities dies from a fall down the stairs after his wife's murder because he couldn't find her. The pressure increases on the police, and Capuana and the  chief are utterly begrudged by the public backlash and the missing leads they needed to break the case. Barbara consoles Capuana at home, and he openly states he wishes he was back at his home town. A false suspect with mental instability places a call to try and falsely confess to the crimes. When this breaks the news, the killer is furious and anonymously calls Capuana on his office phone. The killer threatens to kill Barbara, revealing she's also cheating and he will slaughter her where she meets her lover.

Capuana is horrified when he thinks back to just who might be the mister, and he realizes a mutual friend of the couple they new for years is Barbara's lover. Capuana knows the friend's home, but not the killer's home, until he plays the recording of the call back and recognizes the sounds of a grandfather clock, in an office he's been in before. Capuana rushes to the office and finds the film equipment used for the photos at the murder scenes, including proof of Barbara's affair. Going through the desk, Capuana eventually reads newspaper clippings, revealing the motive of the killer is his wife dying in a car accident after she left the country for a meeting with her lover, which broke the killer's heart and turned his grief into rage at women and infidelity.

Capuana reaches the friend's house, where Barbara's already there. The killer arrives just as Capuana peers through the window, attacking Barbara. Too heartbroken and seething with bitterness over Barbara's betrayal, Capuana doesn't save her and just watches through the window as Barbara violently dies. She grabs at and rips the stocking mask over the killer's face to see who he is before she loses too much blood, the killer leaving photos around her too. Capuana enters and stops the killer from running, revealing Casali had always been the murderer. Without provocation, Capuana shoots Casali dead point-blank, then takes a breath and calls the chief from the phone in the house to inform him the case is over.

Cast 
 Farley Granger: Inspector Capuana
 Sylva Koscina: Barbara Capuana
 Silvano Tranquilli: Paolo Santangeli
 Annabella Incontrera: Franca Santangeli
 Chris Avram: Professor Casali
 Femi Benussi: Serena
 Krista Nell: Renata
 Angela Covello: Bettina Santangeli
 Susan Scott: Lilly
 Luciano Rossi: Gastone

References

External links

So Sweet, So Dead at Variety Distribution

1972 films
1970s crime thriller films
Giallo films
Films directed by Roberto Bianchi Montero
1970s Italian-language films
1970s Italian films